Afram Plains District is a former district that was located in Eastern Region, Ghana. Originally created as an ordinary district assembly in 1988 when it was known as Kwahu North District, which was created from the former Kwahu District Council, until it was later renamed to become Afram Plains District in 1993. However on 19 June 2012, it was split off into two new districts: Kwahu Afram Plains North District (capital: Donkorkrom) and Kwahu Afram Plains South District (capital: Tease). The district assembly was located in the northern part of Eastern Region and had Donkorkrom as its capital town.

Administration
In Kwahu Afram Plains North District, they currently have Hon. Betty Mensah, who succeeded Hon. Emmanuel Aboagye Didie as the member of Parliament and Hon. Samuel Kena as the district chief executive. Hon. Samuel Kena is a retired educationist.

Recreation
Area well noted for fresh water fishing and production of smoked fish. Most major markets in Ghana receive their smoked fish from this area. Traditionally, owned by the Kwahu but occupied much by the Ewes and Krobos due to the fishing.

Sources
 
 District: Kwahu North District

References

1989 disestablishments in Africa
Eastern Region (Ghana)
Former districts of Ghana
States and territories disestablished in 1989